Saint Sacerdos (Sardot or Serdot) of Lyon (487 – 552) was Archbishop of Lyon from 544 to 552. He is venerated as a saint in the Catholic Church whose feast day is 12 September.

Life
Sacerdos was the son of St. Rusticus, Archbishop of Lyon, and his wife.

Sacerdos was a distinguished Bishop of Lyons who He presided at the Fifth Council of Orléans in 549 He is thought to have built the Église Saint-Paul, and the Church of Saint-Eulalia, which later became the Église Saint-Georges.

His son Saint Aurelianus was an Archbishop of Arles. His nephew Nicetius of Lyon (Nizier) succeeded him as Archbishop of Lyon.

He died at Paris, King Childebert, whose adviser he had been, assisting at his deathbed. His remains were transported to Lyons, where he was buried in the church of the Apostles, later known as the Church of Saint Nicholas.

References

External links 
Saints of September 12: Sacerdos of Lyon

487 births
551 deaths
Archbishops of Lyon
6th-century archbishops
6th-century Frankish saints
6th-century Burgundian bishops